Franklin Daliba "Daddys Boy" Nyenetue (born 16 November 2000) is a Norwegian professional footballer who plays for Sandefjord.

Hailing from Stjørdal, he started his career in Tangmoen IL and played football for IL Stjørdals-Blink before joining Rosenborg BK's boys under-16 team. For Rosenborg's senior team, he appeared once on the bench before being loaned out in the latter half of 2020 to Stjørdals-Blink. Ahead of the 2021 season he was picked up by Sandefjord Fotball, where he made his Eliteserien debut in May 2021 against Mjøndalen.

On the middle name "Daddys Boy", he explained that he was originally named Daliba, growing up in Liberia. It was changed upon his arrival with his family in Norway at the age of 3.

Career statistics

Club

References

2000 births
Living people
Liberian emigrants to Norway
People from Stjørdal
Norwegian footballers
IL Stjørdals-Blink players
Sandefjord Fotball players
Norwegian First Division players
Eliteserien players
Association football forwards